HMS Fly (J306) was a reciprocating engine-powered  during the Second World War. She survived the war and was sold to Iran in 1949 as IIS Palang.

Design and description 

The ships' complement consisted of 85 officers and ratings.

The reciprocating ships had two vertical triple-expansion steam engines, each driving one shaft, using steam provided by two Admiralty three-drum boilers.

The Algerine class was armed with a QF  Mk V anti-aircraft gun and four twin-gun mounts for Oerlikon 20 mm cannon. The latter guns were in short supply when the first ships were being completed and they often got a proportion of single mounts. By 1944, single-barrel Bofors 40 mm mounts began replacing the twin 20 mm mounts on a one for one basis. All of the ships were fitted for four throwers and two rails for depth charges.

Construction and career

Service in the Royal Navy 
The ship was ordered on 27 May 1941 at the Lobnitz & Company at Renfrew, Scotland. She was laid down on 6 October 1941 and launched on 1 June 1942. She was commissioned on 10 October 1942.

On 2 November, she conducted anti-submarine exercise off Tobermory together with the submarine HMS H43. Few days later on the 6th, HMS Racehorse joined the two ships in the exercise. The next day, Racehorse was replaced by HMS Eriskay.

In 1946, she was put into the 12th Minesweeper Flotilla as their flotilla leader together with HMS Cadmus, HMS Acute, HMS Circe, HMS Albacore and HMS Mutine. The flotilla was dispatched to sweep the mine fields off the French, Dutch coast and islands.

Fly was decommissioned by the Navy in February 1947 and put into the reserve fleet.

On 30 July 1949, the ship was sold to the Persian Navy.

Service in the Persian Navy 
She was reclassified as a frigate and renamed IIS Palang after being acquired by the Navy.

In 1966, Palang was decommissioned by the Navy.

In 1972, the ship was stricken and sold for scrap.

References

Bibliography 

 
 
 Peter Elliott (1977) Allied Escort Ships of World War II. MacDonald & Janes,

External links 

 

 

Algerine-class minesweepers of the Royal Navy
Ships built in Scotland
1942 ships
World War II minesweepers of the United Kingdom
Frigates of Iran